The Hercates or Hergates were an ancient Ligurian tribe mentioned by Livy as being subjugated by Rome in 175 BCE. (Liv. xli. 19.)

References
Smith, Dictionary of Greek and Roman Geography (1857), s.v. Ligures

Ligures
Tribes conquered by Rome
Tribes conquered by the Roman Republic